Ambrose Hussey (1807 – 21 March 1849) was a British Conservative politician.

Hussey was elected Conservative Member of Parliament for Salisbury at a by-election in 1843—caused by the resignation of William Bird Brodie—and held the seat until 1847 when he too resigned by accepting the office of Steward of the Chiltern Hundreds.

References

External links
 

UK MPs 1841–1847
Conservative Party (UK) MPs for English constituencies
1807 births
1849 deaths